The  was a limited express overnight sleeping car train service in Japan operated by Japanese National Railways (JNR) and later by West Japan Railway Company (JR West), which ran from  to  and  in Shimane Prefecture until March 2006.

Rolling stock
In its latter years, the Izumo service was operated using JR East 24/25 series sleeping cars based at Oku Depot in Tokyo. Services were however operated by JR West staff.

History
From 15 March 1972, the train was upgraded to become a "limited express" service.

From 10 July 1998, one pair of Izumo services was replaced by new 285 series electric multiple unit trains running as the Sunrise Izumo together with the Sunrise Seto via .

The last remaining Izumo services were withdrawn from the start of the revised timetable on 18 March 2006.

See also
 Blue Train (Japan)

References

West Japan Railway Company
Named passenger trains of Japan
Night trains of Japan
Railway services introduced in 1947
Railway services discontinued in 2006